The Madrid Accords, formally the Declaration of Principles on Western Sahara, was a treaty between Spain, Morocco, and Mauritania setting out six principles which would end the Spanish presence in the territory of Spanish Sahara and arrange a temporary administration in the area pending a referendum.

The territory had been a Spanish province and former colony. The agreement was signed in Madrid on November 14, 1975, six days before Franco died, although it was never published on the Boletin Oficial del Estado. This agreement conflicted with the Law on decolonization of Sahara, ratified by the Spanish Parliament (Cortes) on November 18.
Under the Madrid agreement, the territory would then be divided between Morocco and Mauritania, with no role for either the Polisario Front or the Sahrawi people generally. Following the accords, the Polisario relocated from the Mauritanian border to Algeria.

Background 

The province's future had been in dispute for several years, with both Morocco and Mauritania demanding its full annexation to their territory and Spain attempting to introduce either a regime of internal autonomy or a Sahrawi pro-Spanish independent state. Additionally, an independent group of indigenous Sahrawis called the Polisario Front sought independence through guerrilla warfare. The United Nations had since 1963 regarded the area as a colony, and demanded self-determination for it in accordance with General Assembly Resolution 1514.

Motivations of the parties 
The Madrid Accords followed on the heels of the Green March, a 350,000 strong Moroccan demonstration on 6 November 1975 called by King Hassan II, intended to put pressure on Spanish authorities.

Rabat had been claiming the territory as historically Moroccan since its accession to independence in 1956. Immediately after Morocco's independence, the Moroccan Liberation Army's southern branch, the Saharan Liberation Army, had battled Spanish troops in Sidi Ifni, Saguia el-Hamra and Río de Oro, and managed to free most of the territory. Madrid later regained full control in 1958 with French help. Moroccan demands for the territory continued in the 1960s and increased in intensity in the early 1970s as it became apparent that colonialism was expiring.

Thompson and Adloff argue (e.g., pp. 132–134, 164–167) that the Green March, as well as increasingly heated rhetorical exchanges between Madrid and Rabat had convinced Spain that Morocco was willing to enter into war over the territory; a U.S. Central Intelligence Agency memorandum to Henry Kissinger had stated as much in early October 1975. With Spanish leader Francisco Franco dying (he had entered into a coma and died on November 20), the government was anxious to avoid conflict and decided to split the territory in order to preserve maximum possible influence and economic benefit.

President Moktar Ould Daddah had claimed the territory as part of "Greater Mauritania" even before independence (Ould Ahmed Salem, p. 498). Some argue that the intent of Mauritania's claims was to keep Morocco's border with Mauritania farther away. However, Rabat had historically claimed a "Greater Morocco", in which Spanish Sahara and Mauritania were parts of Morocco, until 1969, when the latter claim regarding Mauritania was dropped.

Content and importance 
Thompson and Adloff write,

According to [the treaty's] publicised terms, Spain agreed to decolonise the Sahara and leave the area before 28 February 1976. In the interim, the territory would be administered by the Spanish governor general, assisted by two Moroccan and Mauritanian deputy governors, who would respect Sahrawi public opinion as expressed through the yemaa. (...) As to the Bu Craa (a phosphate mine) deposits, Spain would retain 35 per cent of the shares in the Fosfatos de Bucraa, S. A., Fosbucraa company, and a portion of the 65 per cent that would go to Morocco would presumably be allotted to Mauritania. Reportedly there were unpublicised agreements among the three signatories that gave satisfaction to Spain as regards its fishing rights and included a postponement of further Moroccan demands for the presidios, as well as compensation for repatriated Spanish and Canary Island civilians. (p. 175)

The United States Library of Congress study of Mauritania (1990) states that,

In early 1975, both Morocco and Mauritania agreed to abide by the decision of the International Court of Justice on the status of the Spanish Sahara, but when the court  ruled in October 1975 that neither country was entitled to claim sovereignty over the territory, both governments chose to ignore the decision. In November 1975, they concluded the Madrid Agreements with Spain under which Morocco acquired the northern two-thirds of the territory, while Mauritania acquired the southern third. The agreement also included the proviso that Spain would retain shares in the Bu Craa mining enterprise. Mauritania acquiesced to the agreements under the assumption, probably correct, that Morocco, with its superior military power, would otherwise have absorbed the entire territory.Library of Congress Country Studies. Mauritania. Madrid Agreements.  June 1988.

Results 

The agreement was bitterly opposed by Algeria and the Polisario Front, which remained committed to independence. Algeria dispatched a high-level delegation to Madrid in order to pressure Spain not to sign the Accords and started supporting the Polisario Front militarily and diplomatically by early 1975. Algeria officially viewed its opposition as a way to uphold the UN charter and combat colonialism, although many observers believed that Algeria's actions were more to counter Morocco's influence and to gain access to the Atlantic Ocean. A long-standing rivalry between the two countries contributed to the tense relations.

The Boumédiène government consequently broke with Morocco and started supplying the Polisario guerrillas with weapons and refuge and condemned the Accords internationally. Algeria expelled some 45,000 Moroccan citizens then living in Algeria, and began radio broadcasts in support of both the Polisario and – more briefly – a separatist group in the Canary Islands, the latter presumably in an attempt to punish Spain.

Morocco and Mauritania split the territory between them in the Western Sahara partition agreement, and moved in to assert their claims; this resulted in armed clashes erupted between the two countries troops and Polisario. Polisario and Algeria both deemed the advance of Morocco and Mauritania as a foreign invasion, while Morocco and Mauritania saw the fight against Polisario as a fight against a separatist group. In support of Polisario, Algeria sent troops deep into the territory, but they eventually retreated after the Amgala battle in 1976.

The clashes turned into a 17-year-long war, during which Mauritania was forced to retreat, abandoning all claims to the region, in 1979. As an effect of the conflict, a part of the territory's population became refugees. It was finally ended with a ceasefire in 1991.

Today, the status of the territory, now called Western Sahara, remains in dispute.

International status of the accords 
The United Nations considers Western Sahara to remain a Non-Sovereign Territory, awaiting formal decolonization. It recognizes that Morocco presently administers much of it de facto, but neither the General Assembly nor any other UN body has ever recognized this as constituting sovereignty.
In a 2002 letter of the General Secretary for Legal Affairs and Legal Counsel of the United Nations, Hans Corell, in which he gave an opinion on the legality of actions taken by Moroccan authorities in signing contracts for the exploration of mineral resources in Western Sahara, he stated:

Morocco continues to claim Western Sahara as an integral part of its territory, by virtue of the Madrid Accords inter alia. The Polisario Front declared in 1976 an Algeria-based government-in-exile, the Sahrawi Arab Democratic Republic (SADR), which denies that the Madrid Accords held any validity and claims the entire area whereas actually controlling only small uninhabitable parts of it. The SADR is also unrecognized by the UN, but has been admitted as Western Sahara's representative to the African Union (AU) and its ruling party (the Polisario Front) is recognized by the UN at least as the "sole legitimate representative of the Sahrawi people". Mauritania has pulled out from the conflict entirely since 1979.

Morocco broke the treaty to spark the 2020 Western Sahara clashes.

Text of the Madrid Accords 
The following is the published text of the Madrid Accords:

Notes

References

Further reading 
 Douglas E. Ashford, Johns Hopkins University, The Irredentist Appeal in Morocco and Mauritania, The Western Political Quarterly, Vol. 15, No. 5, 1962–12, pp. 641–651
 Tony Hodges (1983), Western Sahara: The Roots of a Desert War, Lawrence Hill Books
 Anthony G. Pazzanita (2006), Historical Dictionary of Western Sahara, Scarecrow Press
 Zekeria Ould Ahmed Salem, "Mauritania: A Saharan Frontier State", Journal of North Africa Studies, Vol. 10, No. 3–4, Sep–Dec. 2005, pp. 491–506.
 Pennell, C. R. (2000), Morocco since 1830. A History, New York University Press
 Thompson, Virginia;  Adloff, Richard  (1980), The Western Saharans. Background to Conflict, Barnes & Noble Books
Mundy, Jacob,  "How the US and Morocco seized Western Sahara", January 2006.

1975 in international relations
1975 in Mauritania
1975 in Morocco
1975 in Spain
Accords
Mauritania–Morocco relations
Mauritania–Spain relations
Morocco–Spain relations
November 1975 events in Europe
Spanish Sahara
Treaties concluded in 1975
Treaties of Francoist Spain
Treaties of Mauritania
Treaties of Morocco